Pimmit Run is a  stream in northern Virginia that runs from Fairfax County to the Potomac River at Chain Bridge in the Arlingwood neighborhood of Arlington.

Description
Pimmit Run forms south of Leesburg Pike (State Route 7), in Idylwood, Virginia, near George C. Marshall High School. The run flows underground until it crosses Leesburg Pike, then flows openly past Pimmit Hills. Originally, the part of the run south of Leesburg Pike flowed above ground as well, but development gradually forced it underground. The portion of the stream that borders Pimmit Hills was widened and lined with concrete in the early 1970s to prevent flooding.

From Pimmit Hills, Pimmit Run flows northeast through Pimmit Run Stream Valley Park and then under the Dulles Toll Road into Devon Park and Chesterbrook Gardens neighborhoods. Pimmit Run continues on its northeastern course meandering through Pimmit Run Stream Valley Park. At Westmont, the stream is joined by Little Pimmit Run before paralleling the George Washington Memorial Parkway and flowing southeast into Arlington. The stream parallels Chain Bridge Road as it bisects the Arlington Bluff and empties into the Potomac just downstream of the bridge.

The stream was named for John Pimmit, who in 1675 was an overseer for William Fitzhugh (1651–1701). Pimmit was naturalized a citizen in 1679. He died by drowning in February 1688, on the Potomac River, near the mouth of the stream which was named after him. He was survived by three children: John, Margaret and William.

Tributaries 
Pimmit Run's tributaries are listed from its headwaters to its mouth.

Bridge Branch
Burke's Spring Branch
Saucy Branch
Bryan Branch
Little Pimmit Run
Stromans Branch

According to the Geographic Names Information System, Pimmit Run has also been known by the following names.

Pimmet's Run 	
Catfish Run	
Upper Spout Run

See also
List of rivers of Virginia

References

External links 
Pimmit Run Trail

Rivers of Virginia
Rivers of Fairfax County, Virginia
Rivers of Arlington County, Virginia
Tributaries of the Potomac River